Peter Tasker is a former assistant bishop in the Anglican Diocese of Sydney, Bishop of Georges River.

Tasker was educated at Moore Theological College and ordained in 1964. After curacies in Wollongong, Chatswood and Engadine he was Vicar of St George's Penang in Malaya from 1970.

Tasker retired in 2009, but was acting bishop of Georges River from June 2013 to May 2015, when there was neither assistant bishop nor archdeacon, owing to funding problems.

References

20th-century Anglican bishops in Australia
21st-century Anglican bishops in Australia
Assistant bishops in the Anglican Diocese of Sydney
Evangelical Anglican bishops
Living people
Year of birth missing (living people)